Maxwell Braden Mittelman (born September 5, 1990) is an American voice actor who provides voices for English versions of anime, animation and video games. Some of his major roles include Saitama in One-Punch Man, Kousei Arima in Your Lie in April, Hikari Sakishima in A Lull in the Sea, King from The Seven Deadly Sins, Ritsu Kageyama in Mob Psycho 100, Inaho Kaizuka in Aldnoah.Zero, Atsushi Nakajima in Bungo Stray Dogs and Io Flemming in Mobile Suit Gundam Thunderbolt, Kira Yamato in Mobile Suite Gundam Seed Remastered  and Mobile Suite Gundam Seed Destiny Remastered, Nacht Faust from Black Clover, and Plagg from Miraculous Ladybug. In video games, he voices McBurn and Lechter Arundel in The Legend of Heroes: Trails of Cold Steel II, Shigure Rangetsu in Tales of Berseria, Ryuji Sakamoto in Persona 5, Troy Calypso in Borderlands 3, Peter Boggs in Grounded,  Fidel Camuze in Star Ocean: Integrity and Faithlessness, Andy Arlington on The PBSKGo! Series M&M, Claude Wallace in Valkyria Chronicles 4, Louis in Code Vein, Red XIII in Final Fantasy VII Remake and Arataki Itto in Genshin Impact.

Early life
Mittelman was born on September 5, 1990, in Los Angeles. His family is of German Jewish descent, and he is descended from Holocaust survivors. In the fall of 2009, Mittelman began his studies at UCLA.

Filmography

Anime

Animation

Films

Video games

Live-action

References

External links
 
 
 

Living people
American male voice actors
American people of German descent
American people of German-Jewish descent
University of Southern California alumni
American male video game actors
Male actors from Los Angeles
People from Los Angeles
Twitch (service) streamers
21st-century American male actors
1990 births
Jewish American male actors